The King's Plate (known as the Queen's Plate between 1860 to 1901 and 1952 to 2022) is Canada's oldest Thoroughbred horse race, having been founded in 1860. It is also the oldest continuously run race in North America. The race takes place each summer at Woodbine Racetrack in Etobicoke, Ontario. It is the first race in the Canadian Triple Crown.

The King's Plate has typically been held in June or July, but in 2020 the race was postponed to September due to the COVID-19 pandemic in Canada. Woodbine then elected to run the 2021 and 2022 editions of the race in August.

Historically, the race has been named in honour of the reigning monarch. The Woodbine Entertainment Group, which owns and operates the event, announced in December 2022 the race will again be renamed the King's Plate as a result of the  September 2022 accession of King Charles III.

History
In 1859, when Canada West was still a colony of Britain, the then-president of the Toronto Turf Club, Sir Casimir Gzowski, petitioned Queen Victoria to grant a plate for a new race in the territory. Upon royal assent, the first Queen's Plate was run on June 27, 1860, at the Carleton racetrack in Toronto, with the prize of "a plate to the value of 50 guineas". Despite the name of the race, the winning owner is presented with a gold cup rather than a plate.

Originally, the race was restricted to three-year-olds bred in Canada that had never won a stakes race. The race was originally run in heats, with a horse having to win two heats to be declared the winner. Over the years, the race conditions have evolved. Heat racing was discontinued in 1879, and the race was opened to stakes winners around the same time (some early records are incomplete). For many years, the race was open to older horses and in the early 1900s was even open to two-year-olds. The race is currently restricted to three-year-olds foaled in Canada. The owner must pay a nomination fee ($500 in 2018) in February, a second subscription fee ($1,500 in 2018) in May and a final entry fee ($10,000) in prior to the race.
]
The first four renewals were run at Carleton racetrack. After that, the Queen's Plate became a "movable feast", with politicians from all over modern-day Ontario vying to host the race in their constituency. Fifteen different race tracks hosted the race over the next two decades, with distances varying from one to two miles. In 1883, the race moved to Old Woodbine, located in eastern Toronto along Lake Ontario. The race continued to be held at Old Woodbine until that track was replaced by "New" Woodbine in northern Toronto in 1956. The race has been run at Woodbine ever since. In 2006, Woodbine changed the track surface for the main track from natural dirt to a synthetic surface known as Polytrack. In 2016, the surface was changed to Tapeta. Because of the change in racing surfaces, Woodbine maintains several sets of track and stakes records. The fastest time for the race on the original dirt surface at the current  distance is 2:01 4/5, set by Kinghaven Farms' Izvestia in 1990. The current stakes record (the fastest all-time) is 2:01.48, set by Moira in 2022 on Tapeta.
 
In 1902, the year after Victoria's death, the race became the King's Plate, after her successor, Edward VII. It became the Queen's Plate again during the reign of Elizabeth II (1952–2022). In 2022, it reverted to the King's Plate upon the accession of Charles III.

Horses owned by Windfields Farm have won the Plate eleven times, but the most successful was the stable owned by Joseph E. Seagram, a prominent distiller from Waterloo, Ontario. Seagram's stable won the Plate on twenty occasions between 1891 and 1935 including eight times in a row between 1891 and 1898, and ten times in eleven years from 1891 to 1901.

At the 1925 King's Plate, W. A. Hewitt and his son Foster Hewitt called the first horse race broadcast on radio.

In 1964, Northern Dancer, the first Canadian-bred horse to win the Kentucky Derby, also won the Queen's Plate in his final race.

In 2006, Josie Carroll became the first woman trainer to win the Queen's Plate. The following year, Emma-Jayne Wilson became the first female jockey to win the race.

The 2004-2013 Plate winners had little success in their subsequent racing careers. This compares unfavourably to the 1990s when a number of Plate winners had considerable success thereafter, including With Approval, Izvestia, Dance Smartly and Awesome Again. The more recent Queen's Plate winners have also been successful, including Lexie Lou (who became a multiple graded stakes winner in Canada and the US after winning the Plate in 2014) and Shaman Ghost (a Grade I winner in America after winning the Plate in 2015).

Nick Eaves, former President and CEO of Woodbine Entertainment Group, announced during the 2012 Queen's Plate post position draw that Woodbine Racetrack might be forced to close in April 2013 due to the cancellation of Slots at Racetrack program partnerships between Ontario's racetracks and the Ontario Lottery and Gaming Corporation. Eaves said that if Woodbine is not open, "there won't be a Queen's Plate." A new funding agreement was put in place in March 2013, which ensured the continuation of horse racing at Woodbine.

38 fillies have won the Plate, beginning with Brunette in 1864. The 2017 running was won by filly Holy Helena, while the 2018 running was won by Wonder Gadot. Two chestnut fillies both by the name of Wild Rose have won the Queen's Plate, in 1867 and 1886. They were the daughter and great-great-grand-daughter respectively of Yellow Rose, who also produced the first Queen's Plate winner Don Juan.

The latest filly to win the Queen's Plate was Moira in 2022, whose final time of 2:01.48 established an all-time speed record.

The race has been held at a variety of distances:
 1860–1867:  heats
 1868–1870: 
 1871:  miles (2.82 km)
 1872–1886:  miles (2.4 km)
 1887–1923:  miles (2.01 km)
 1924–1956:  miles (1.811 km)
 1957-:  miles (2.01 km)

Royal patronage

As King of Canada, Charles III is patron of the event. Various other members of the Canadian Royal Family have been in attendance through the years, beginning with the Duke of Argyll and his wife, Princess Louise, Duchess of Argyll, in 1881, when the Duke was serving as Governor General of Canada and the couple was touring Ontario. Elizabeth II's fourth and final visit to the race was in early July 2010.

Records
Stakes Record
 Dirt – Izvestia — 2:01 (1990)
 Synthetic dirt - Moira – 2.01.48 (2022)

Winningest Jockeys:
 4 – Avelino Gomez (1957, 1960, 1966, 1969)
 4 – Sandy Hawley (1970, 1971, 1975, 1978)
 4 – Robin Platts (1972, 1974, 1977, 1984)

Winningest Trainers:
 8 – Harry Giddings Jr. (1911, 1913, 1914, 1920, 1931, 1932, 1934, 1942)
 8 – Roger Attfield (1976, 1987, 1989, 1990, 1992, 1993, 1995, 2008)
 6 – John R. Walker (1891, 1892, 1893, 1894, 1895, 1896)
 6 – Gordon J. "Pete" McCann (1940, 1951, 1953, 1957, 1959, 1963)
 6 - William H. Bringloe (1923, 1926, 1928, 1933, 1936, 1937)

Winningest Owners:
 20 - Seagram Stables
 11 - Windfields Farm

Winners

† indicates a filly

References

 Racing Post:

Bibliography
 Cauz, Louis E. The Plate. (1984) Deneau Publishers

External links

 

 
Restricted stakes races in Canada
Horse races in Canada
Flat horse races for three-year-olds
Organizations based in Canada with royal patronage
Triple Crown of Thoroughbred Racing
Woodbine Racetrack
Recurring sporting events established in 1860
1860 establishments in Ontario
Summer events in Canada